"Sugar Shack" is a song written in 1962 by Keith McCormack. McCormack gave songwriting credit to his aunt, Beulah Faye Voss, after asking what are "those tight pants that girls wear" to which she replied "leotards". The song was recorded in 1963 by Jimmy Gilmer and the Fireballs at Norman Petty Studios in Clovis, New Mexico. The unusual and distinctive organ part was played by Petty on a Hammond Solovox, Model J. The original instrument is on display at the Norman Petty Studios today.

"Sugar Shack" hit No. 1 on both the Billboard Hot 100 (where it spent five weeks from October 12 to November 9, 1963) and Cashbox singles charts (where it spent three weeks from October 19 to November 2, 1963). It ended up being Billboard'''s number 1 song of 1963. ("Surfin' U.S.A." was originally listed as the No. 1 song of the year, but later lists place "Sugar Shack" at No. 1.) Its No. 1 run on the Billboard R&B chart was cut short because Billboard did not publish an R&B chart from November 30, 1963 to January 23, 1965.  In Canada the song was No. 1, also for five weeks, from October 14 to November 11. On November 29, 1963, the song received RIAA certification for selling over a million copies, earning gold record status. In the UK, "Sugar Shack" also reached No. 45 on the Record Retailer chart. Gilmer and The Fireballs were the last American band to chart before Beatlemania hit.

The song is featured in the films Mermaids, Dogfight, Forrest Gump, Congo, and Stealing Sinatra, and in the television show Supernatural''.

In December 1965, the song was covered by Steve Brett, a singer from the Midlands area of the UK, and was released as the B-side of his single "Chains On My Heart", on the Columbia label (catalogue number DB7794). His backing group, The Mavericks, included Noddy Holder, who eventually came to fame with Slade.

Charts

All-time charts

References

External Links 

Interview with Keith McCormack in International Songwriters Association's "Songwriter Magazine"

1962 songs
1963 singles
Songs written by Keith McCormack
The Fireballs songs
Billboard Hot 100 number-one singles
Cashbox number-one singles
Dot Records singles